Richard Henry Whiteley (December 22, 1830 – September 26, 1890) was a U.S. representative and U.S. senator-elect from Georgia.

Biography
Born in County Kildare, Ireland, Whiteley immigrated to the United States in 1836 with his parents, who settled in Georgia. He received private instruction in elementary education. He engaged in manufacturing. He studied law and was admitted to the bar in 1860, commencing practice in Bainbridge, Georgia.

Whiteley opposed secession, but after the adoption of the ordinance entered the Confederate States Army and fought throughout the Civil War. He served in the 5th Georgia Infantry and 2nd Georgia Sharpshooter Battalion, attaining the rank of major. He served as member of the State constitutional convention in 1867.

He was an unsuccessful candidate for election in 1866 to the Fortieth Congress, then presented credentials as a senator-elect to the United States Senate on July 15, 1870, to fill the vacancy in the term beginning March 4, 1865, but as the election took place prior to the readmission of Georgia into the Union was not admitted to a seat.

Whiteley was elected as a Republican to the Forty-first Congress to fill the vacancy caused by the House declaring Nelson Tift not entitled to the seat. He was reelected to the Forty-second and Forty-third Congresses and served from December 22, 1870, to March 3, 1875. He was an unsuccessful candidate for reelection to the Forty-fourth Congress and for election to the Forty-fifth Congress.

Following his time in Congress, he moved to Boulder, Colorado, in 1877 and resumed the practice of his profession. He died in Boulder on September 26, 1890, and was interred in the Masonic Cemetery.

Notes

References
 Retrieved on 2008-02-14

External links

1830 births
1890 deaths
Confederate States Army officers
Irish soldiers in the Confederate States Army
Republican Party members of the United States House of Representatives from Georgia (U.S. state)
Politicians from Boulder, Colorado
Irish emigrants to the United States (before 1923)
People from Bainbridge, Georgia
Colorado Republicans
19th-century American politicians
Military personnel from Colorado